Hang East was a Wapentake (Hundred), which is an administrative division (or ancient district), in the historic county of the North Riding of Yorkshire. It was one of the smaller wapentakes by area and consisted of nine parishes and two towns; Bedale and Masham.

History
Hang East and Hang West were originally one wapentake (Hang), and formed part of the Honour of Richmond from the 11th century. Hang was divided into two in the 13th century; this is why Hang East wapentake derives its name from a hill which was no longer in its area.
Its name derives from its meeting place of Hang Bank  which was halfway between Hutton Hang and the village of Finghall. Hang is believed to derive from the Old English word Hangar which meant a wooded slope. The place is mentioned in the Domesday Book as Hotun.  

Hang East was divided up into nine parishes; Bedale, Catterick, Hornby, Kirkby Fleetham, Masham, Patrick Brompton, Scruton, Thornton Watlass and Well.  It was bordered to the south by Claro Wapentake and to the east by Hallikeld and Gilling East Wapentakes. To the north lay Richmond and Gilling West Wapentake with Hang West on its western edge.

It was chiefly agricultural in nature and possessed two market towns; Bedale and Masham. Its land was described as being more fertile and low-lying than Hang West wapentake (to the west) which contained steeper valleys and higher peaks. In modern times, the area that the Wapentake covered is divided between the Hambleton and Richmondshire districts of North Yorkshire.

Settlements
The table below lists the settlements within the Hang East Wapentake. These are as listed in Bulmer's North Riding and White's History, Gazetteer, and Directory, of the East and North Ridings of Yorkshire.

(BP=Bedale Parish, CP=Catterick Parish, HP=Hornby Parish, KFP=Kirkby Fleetham Parish, MP=Masham Parish, PBP=Patrick Brompton Parish, SP=Scruton Parish, TWP=Thornton Watlass Parish, WP=Well Parish)

Exelby with Leeming and Newton used to be in Hallikeld Wapentake, but was transferred to Hang East in the early 19th century, hence the sign on the road with Hang East instead of Hallikeld. The HD on the sign stands for Highway District (Hang East Highway District took its name from the wapentake) and the Highways District maintained the roads in the former Wapentake area.

Notes

References

Sources

Wapentakes of the North Riding of Yorkshire